The 2015 United Kingdom local elections were held on Thursday 7 May 2015, the same day as the general election for the House of Commons of the United Kingdom.

With the exception of those areas that have had boundary changes, the council seats up for election in England were last contested in the 2011 local elections.

Background
Elections would have been due in Northern Ireland given the previous elections to all 26 local councils in 2011, but these councils have since been scrapped and replaced by 11 super-councils, which had their inaugural elections in 2014.

All registered electors (British, Irish, Commonwealth and European Union citizens) who will be aged 18 or over on the day of the election were entitled to vote in the local elections. Those who will be temporarily away from their ordinary address (for example, away working, on holiday, in student accommodation or in hospital) are also entitled to vote in the local elections, although those who have moved abroad and registered as overseas electors cannot vote in the local elections. Those who are registered to vote at more than one address (such as a university student who has a term-time address and lives at home during holidays) are entitled to vote in the local elections at either address, as long as they are not in the same local government area.

Results
Full results as reported by BBC News:

Analysis
In 2015, direct elections were held in 279 of the 293 local districts in England: 36 metropolitan boroughs, 194 of the second-tier districts, and 49 of the unitary authorities. There were no local elections in London, Scotland, or Wales.

There were also six elections for directly elected mayors, as well as elections to many parish councils and town councils, and a few local referendums.

As was the case in the simultaneously-held general election, the Conservative Party was considered the clear winners of the local elections, winning overall control of more than thirty local councils, mostly from councils that before the election had no overall control (i.e., no majority held by any one party). The Conservatives retained control of the Solihull and Trafford councils, the only two metropolitan boroughs that it held before the election, slightly increasing its majority on both. Among the unitary councils, the Conservatives won control of Bath and North East Somerset for the first time.

As was the case in the general election, the Labour Party and Liberal Democrats performed poorly. Labour lost control of the Walsall metropolitan borough and the Plymouth and Stoke-on-Trent unitary authorities, both to no overall control.

The Green Party of England and Wales lost their status as the largest party on Brighton and Hove City Council to Labour.

The UK Independence Party won control of the Thanet District Council, going from two to 33 seats on that council.  This marked the first time that UKIP won control of a local council.

According to an analysis by Colin Rallings and Michael Thrasher, more than three-quarters of councils across the UK are now under the majority control of the two largest parties, Conservative and Labour—the highest percentage since the 1970s local government reform. The dominance of the Conservative and Labour parties was not limited to control of councils, but also extended to a seat count, with the two parties holding 77% of seats, the highest since 1980. Rallings and Thrasher found that the decline of the Liberal Democrats accounted for part of this trend. They concluded that "much is said about multi-party Britain but it is time instead to talk about two-party local government."

Metropolitan boroughs
In 35 of the 36 English metropolitan borough councils, one-third of their seats were up for re-election. In Doncaster, all seats were up for re-election due to ward-boundary changes there.

Unitary authorities

Whole council
In 30 English unitary authorities the whole council is up for election.

These were the last elections to the unitary authorities for Bournemouth and Poole, as they are set to be merged into one, along with the area covered by Christchurch District Council into one new authority in 2019.

Third of council
In 19 English unitary authorities one third of the council is up for election.

Non-metropolitan districts

Whole council
In 128 English district authorities the whole council is up for election.

These were the last elections to councils in Christchurch, Corby, East Dorset, East Northamptonshire, Forest Heath, Kettering, North Dorset, Northampton, Purbeck, South Northamptonshire, St Edmundsbury, Suffolk Coastal, Taunton Deane, Waveney, Wellingborough, West Dorset and West Somerset.

These councils are either being merged into larger districts, specifically those in Somerset and Suffolk at the 2019 local elections, while those in Northamptonshire and Dorset are due to have their county councils abolished and converted into 4 unitary authorities, with the new Dorset authorities electing in 2019 and the Northamptonshire authorities electing in 2020 - thus meaning all of the district and borough councillors in Northamptonshire have their terms extended for one year.

Third of council
In 66 English district authorities one third of the council is up for election.

Mayoral elections
Six direct mayoral elections were held.

Local referendums results
A local referendum in Bedfordshire was held on a proposal by Bedfordshire Police and Crime Commissioner Olly Martins, to fund one hundred additional police officers through a 15.8% increase in the police precept (the portion of the council tax set by the police and crime commissioner). The proposal would provide an additional £4.5 million in revenue. The referendum was triggered because the proposed tax increase was above the 2% threshold. Voters decisively rejected the proposal, with 30.5% (91,086 votes) voting yes and 69.5% (207,551 votes) no.

Notes

References

 
 
local elections
2015